Omaha is an unincorporated community in Dickenson County, Virginia, in the United States.

History
A post office was established at Omaha in 1902, and remained in operation until it was discontinued in 1962. Omaha is derived from an Indian name meaning "upriver".

References

Unincorporated communities in Dickenson County, Virginia
Unincorporated communities in Virginia